The Adana chub (Squalius adanaensis) is a cyprinid fish endemic to the lower Seyhan basin in Turkey.

References

Squalius
Fish described in 2013